Route 3 is a highway in northern and central Missouri.  Its northern terminus is at Route 11 south of Kirksville; its southern terminus is at Route 5/Route 240 northwest of Fayette.

Route 3 was initially Route 67, designated in 1922 between Rocheport and Fayette. It was renumbered in 1926 due to US 67. In 1934/1935, the route extended north to US 36 in Callao. The next year, the original portion from Rocheport to Fayette became part of Route 240. In 1953/1954, the route extended north to Kirksville, its current terminus.

Route description

History

Major intersections

References

003
Transportation in Howard County, Missouri
Transportation in Randolph County, Missouri
Transportation in Macon County, Missouri
Transportation in Adair County, Missouri

External links